Knowhutimean? Hey Vern, It's My Family Album is an anthology of comedic short subjects directed by John R. Cherry III, and released direct-to-video in 1983. It was filmed in Nashville, Tennessee. As a whole, it is the first film to feature the advertising character Ernest P. Worrell, played by Jim Varney (who also portrays numerous other characters throughout the picture).

Plot synopsis
The film is set up as a series of sketches featuring Jim Varney's various characters, some of which he introduced in his stand-up comedy routines: Davy, the frontiersman; Ace, the fighter pilot; Lloyd Rowe, the mean-spirited mountain man; Billy, the jive-talking carny; Rhetch, a reckless riverboat gambler; and Ernest's "Pa."

Ernest P. Worrell's appearances serve as a framing device, with the characters introduced as his relatives and the ever-insistent Ernest trying to tell the unwilling-as-usual Vern about the characters.

DVD availability
This comedy short anthology had its first DVD release from Mill Creek Entertainment on October 31, 2006 as part of the DVD box sets Maximum Ernest and Essential Ernest Collection along with "Your World As I See It". Image Entertainment re-released it on June 5, 2012 as part of Ernest's Wacky Adventures: Volume 2 and on January 12, 2016 along with "Your World As I See It" as part of Ultimate Ernest Collection.

External links

1983 films
American anthology films
1983 comedy films
Films directed by John R. Cherry III
American comedy films
Ernest P. Worrell films
Films shot in Tennessee
1980s English-language films
1980s American films